Gyeran-jjim, Dalgyal-jjim or steamed eggs is a type of jjim, Korean steamed dish. It is a custardy, casserole-like banchan (side dish), often seasoned with saeu-jeot (salted shrimp) or myeongnan-jeot (salted pollock roe) and topped with scallions and toasted sesame seeds. The ideal gyeran-jjim is light and fluffy.

Preparation and types 
There are several ways to cook gyeran-jjim. It can be steamed, double-boiled, or boiled in a stovetop-safe crock on a very low heat. For faster cooking, some people microwave the bowl.

Eggs are sieved, and whisked with water until the mixture are completely blended in a cream-like consistency. Sometimes, kelp and/or anchovy broth is used in place of water for a richer flavor. Optional ingredients include mushrooms, peas, onions, Korean zucchini, carrots, and other vegetables for their own twist on the dish. The dish is then seasoned with saeu-jeot (salted shrimp), myeongnan-jeot (salted pollock roe), or salt, and optionally ground black pepper. Before served, it is topped with chopped scallions or crown daisy greens, gochutgaru (chili flakes) or sil-gochu (shredded dry red chili), and toasted sesame seeds.

See also 
 Chawanmushi
 Chinese steamed eggs
 List of egg dishes
 List of Korean dishes
 List of steamed foods

References

External links 

 Gyeran jjim recipe

Korean cuisine
Egg dishes
Steamed foods